The Pointe des Savolaires is a mountain of the western Bernese Alps, located east of Bex in the canton of Vaud. It lies on the chain north of the Dent de Morcles.

References

External links
 Pointe des Savolaires on Hikr

Mountains of the Alps
Mountains of Switzerland
Mountains of the canton of Vaud